The Northern Iloilo State University (NISU) is a state university in the Philippines.  It is mandated to provide higher and advanced education and training in the fields of education, industrial technology, criminology, agriculture, fishery, hospitality management, engineering, sciences and information technology. It is also mandated to promote research, advanced studies, and progressive leadership in various fields.  Its main campus is located in Estancia, Iloilo, Philippines.
Prior to its present conversion as a university, it was called Northern Iloilo Polytechnic State College. It was elevated to a university in 2022, through Republic Act No. 10597 as amended by Republic Act 11005, and upon confirmation by the Commission on Higher Education En Banc Resolution no. 222-2022 dated April 26, 2022.

Brief history
The Northern Iloilo Polytechnic State College was first known as the Western Visayas Branch of the Philippine Institute of Fisheries Technology. The school was authorized in the Omnibus Bill that was enacted as Republic Act No. 687 on May 9, 1952. The school was opened on July 2, 1956.
The school was first administrated by the director of Fisheries through the superintendent of the Philippine Institute of Fisheries Technology (PIFI). Pursuant to the Reorganization Plan No. 30-A, the school together with six other Secondary Schools of Fisheries existing at the time were transferred to the Department of Education effective January 12, 1957.

The school was first administrated by the director of Fisheries through the superintendent of the Philippine Institute of Fisheries Technology (PIFI). Pursuant to the Reorganization Plan No. 30-A, the school together with six other Secondary Schools of Fisheries existing at the time were transferred to the Department of Education effective January 12, 1957.

In 1963, with the creation of Bureau of Vocational Education by virtue of Republic Act. No. 3742, agricultural, fishery and trade-technical schools were transferred from B.P.S. to the Bureau of Vocational Education.

Republic Act. No. 4349 enacted on June 19, 1965, provided for the conversion of this school to a college, otherwise known as the Western Visayas College of Fisheries.
The Estancia High School, a component school of NIPSC, was established in 1949. It was a provincial high school being funded by the provincial government of Iloilo.

The Estancia High School, a component school of NIPSC, was established in 1949. It was a provincial high school being funded by the provincial government of Iloilo.

On June 10, 1983, President Ferdinand E. Marcos signed Batas Pambansa Blg. 500 – converting and integrating the Western Visayas College of Fisheries and Estancia High School, both of which are in Estancia, into a Polytechnic State College.
On August 11, 1989, President Corazon C. Aquino signed R.A. 6747 converting the Barotac Viejo National Agricultural College into a branch of NIPSC to be known as the Northern Iloilo Polytechnic State College Barotac Viejo Campus.

On August 11, 1989, President Corazon C. Aquino signed R.A. 6747 converting the Barotac Viejo National Agricultural College into a branch of NIPSC to be known as the Northern Iloilo Polytechnic State College Barotac Viejo Campus.

On April 26, 2022, Northern Iloilo Polytechnic State College was elevated into a university, through Republic Act Number 10597 as amended by Republic Act Number 11005 and upon confirmation by the Commission on Higher Education (CHED) En Banc Resolution no. 222–2022. With this conversion, Dr. Bobby D. Gerardo was installed as the first University President of Northern Iloilo State University.

Campuses

 Northern Iloilo State University (Main) Estancia, Iloilo
 Northern Iloilo State University in West Campus, Estancia, Iloilo
 Northern Iloilo State University - Ajuy Campus
 Northern Iloilo State University - Barotac Viejo Campus
 Northern Iloilo State University - Batad Campus
 Northern Iloilo State University - Concepcion Campus
 Northern Iloilo State University - Lemery Campus
 Northern Iloilo State University - Victorino Salcedo Campus, Sara

About the Campuses 

NISU is consist of a total of 7 Campuses located in the different municipalities of the fifth district of Iloilo. There are two Campuses of the university located in Estancia, Iloilo. The "Main Campus" is situated in V. Cudilla Ave., Estancia Iloilo while the "West Campus" is located in Poblacion Zone 1, Estancia, Iloilo, Philippines.

Northern Iloilo State University - Ajuy Campus

The campus is located in the Municipality of Ajuy, Iloilo, Philippines, and the current campus administrator is Dr. Wilfreda Arones. NISU Ajuy Campus is the second largest campus next to the main campus in terms of student population. The total student population as of 2022 is 2,847 while the total number of faculty is 31 and the non-teaching staff is 15.

Northern Iloilo State University - Barotac Viejo Campus

The campus is located in the Municipality of Barotac Viejo, Iloilo, Philippines

Northern Iloilo State University - Batad Campus

The campus is located in the Municipality of Batad, Iloilo, Philippines

Northern Iloilo State University - Concepcion Campus

The campus is located in the Municipality of Concepcion, Iloilo, Philippines

Northern Iloilo State University - Lemery Campus

The campus is located in the Municipality of Lemery, Iloilo, Philippines

Northern Iloilo State University - Victorino Salcedo - Sara Campus

The campus is located in the Municipality of Sara, Iloilo, Philippines

References

Universities and colleges in Iloilo
State universities and colleges in the Philippines